Akbarganj railway station is a small railway station in Rae Bareli district, Uttar Pradesh. Its code is AKJ. It serves Akbarganj town. The station consists of two platforms. The platforms are not well sheltered, and the train station lacks many facilities including water and sanitation.

References 

Lucknow NR railway division
Railway stations in Raebareli district